Raton Mesa is the collective name of several mesas on the eastern side of Raton Pass in New Mexico and Colorado.  The name Raton Mesa or Mesas has sometimes been applied to all the mesas that extend east for  along the Colorado-New Mexico border from Raton, New Mexico and Trinidad, Colorado to the Oklahoma panhandle. These include Johnson Mesa, Mesa de Maya, and Black Mesa.

The highest point of Raton Mesa, Fishers Peak, is located in Las Animas County, Colorado. The highest part of the mesa was made a National Natural Landmark in 1967. Raton mesas are volcanic in origin caused by lava flows which solidified into basalt. Over time the softer sedimentary rock surrounding the basalt eroded leaving several distinct large elevated tablelands with precipitous sides.

Raton Mesa is part of the Raton Basin, a coal and natural gas producing region.

Description

Interstate Highway 25 through Raton Pass,  in elevation, separates the foothills of the Sangre de Cristo Mountains to the west from the mesa country on the east.

The flat-topped mesas are mostly grassland, but their steep slopes are wooded with ponderosa pine the dominant species, joined by quaking aspen, Douglas fir, and white fir at higher elevations and pinyon, juniper, and Gambel oak at lower elevations. Mammal species include American black bear, cougar, mule deer, beaver, and especially elk which are seen in herds of more than 100 individuals. Hunting, especially for elk, is popular in season on both public and private lands.

No public roads reach the top of the mesas. The only public road which penetrates the area is through Sugarite Canyon State Park in New Mexico. This road provides access to the three publicly owned areas of Raton Mesa: Surgarite Canyon State Park  in New Mexico and Lake Dorothey State Wildlife Area  and James M. John State Wildlife Area  in Colorado. From the parking area at Lake Dorothey, the summit of Fisher's Peak is a straight-line distance of about eight miles by an unmarked trail.

Much of the Colorado portion of the Raton Mesa, including Fisher's Peak, was owned by the Crazy French Ranch until 2019 when the  ranch was purchased to become a Colorado state park.  Funds to purchase the ranch came jointly from Great Outdoors Colorado, the funding arm of the Colorado Lottery, The Nature Conservancy, and The Trust for Public Land.

References

Further reading 
 
 

Landmarks in Colorado
National Natural Landmarks in Colorado
Natural history of Colorado
Protected areas of Las Animas County, Colorado
Mesas of Colorado
Landforms of Las Animas County, Colorado
Mesas of New Mexico
Landforms of Colfax County, New Mexico